Spur of the Moment is an album of experimental music by Peter Hammill and Guy Evans, originally released as cassette tape on the Red Hot label. A remastered version was released on CD on the DaTE label in February 1988 (not in 1991, as Sofa Sound suggests). The album is currently out of print.

Hammill plays the grand piano, guitar and keyboards driving samplers and synthesizers, and Evans plays acoustic and electronic drumkits. The music is instrumental and entirely improvised. According to the booklet, instruments and fundamental note-patterns were decided upon prior to performing a piece, but no further structure was arranged in advance.

A number of songs from Spur of the Moment were played live in a small number of concerts by Hammill and Evans in 1988 and again in 1996. A recording of one of these concerts from 1996 was released as The Union Chapel Concert.

A 20 second snippet of "Sweating it Out" was used as the theme music for a Boots the Opticians TV commercial.

Album cover
The album cover shows parchment with lines of red and green paint, and in some places a "2" or "two" is discernable.

Track listing
All songs written by Peter Hammill and Guy Evans, except where noted.

"Sweating it Out"
"Surprise"
"Little Did He Know"
"Without a Glitch"
"Anatol's Proposal"
"You Think Not?"
"Multiman"
"Deprogramming Archie" (Hammill, Evans, Ridout)
"Always So Polite"
"An Imagined Brother"
"Bounced"
"Roger and Out" (Hammill, Evans, Ridout)

In the booklet of the CD "Surprise" and "Little did he know" appear as two different titles, but on the CD itself track 2 is called "Surprise / Little did he know" (and consequently the total number of tracks is 11).

The original cassette had songs 1–6 on side A, and songs 7–12 on side B.

Personnel
Peter Hammill – grand piano, guitar and keyboards driving samplers and synthesizers
Guy Evans – acoustic and electronic drum kits

Both players regularly play each other's instruments. As the booklet states: "In much of this music the straight edges of the conventional instrument/instrumentalist picture become blurred; often the overall effect is of one instrument being played by four hands in some strange modern variant on the traditional piano duet."

Technical
Peter Hammill - recording engineer, mixing (Sofa Sound, Bath)
Paul Ridout – engineer, sequenced by, artwork

References

Peter Hammill albums
1988 albums